The wildlife of Niger is composed of its flora and fauna. The wildlife protected areas in the country total about 8.5 million hectares (21 million acres), which is 6.6% of the land area of the country, a figure which is expected to eventually reach the 11% percent target fixed by the IUCN with addition of more areas under the reserve category. The dama gazelle (Gazella dama or Nanger dama) has become a national symbol. Under the Hausa name meyna or ménas the dama appears on the badge of the Niger national football team, who are popularly called the Ménas.

There are 136 mammal species in Niger, of which 2 are critically endangered, 2 are endangered, 9 are vulnerable, and 1 is near-threatened. One of the species listed for Niger can no longer be found in the wild. Bird Life International has reported 528 species of birds of which three are globally threatened and one is an introduced species; many species may be yet to be discovered in the rich avifauna seen here in spite of thin vegetation.

Conservation of wildlife is ensured by laws and regulations enacted by the Government of Niger, which has enforced a permanent ban on hunting so that animals such as lions, hippos and giraffes are safe in the wild. The arrival of Abdim's storks (Ciconia abdimiiis) heralds the impending monsoon season giving a signal to farmers to until the land for agricultural operations.

The Iullemeden, an aquifer rich in ground water resources, underlies Niger and its neighbors Mali and Nigeria and is being closely monitored; these countries are jointly attempting to stop its overexploitation, which is causing not only lowering of ground water levels but also the reduction of storage in the Lake Chad and perennial flows of the Niger River on which wildlife of the country is largely dependent.

Legal provisions

French colonial laws were the initial basis for environmental legislation. Hunting was officially banned in 1974. Over the years after independence, for conservation of wildlife, laws in the form of acts and regulations have been enacted and a large number of wildlife reserves and national parks have been established by the Government of Niger.

Local social attitudes towards the environment 
While the country is not lacking laws and acts in natural resources such as water, forests and trees on arable land, flora and fauna the main issue is of establishing proper implementation mechanism. A general sense of lack of any utility of the wildlife persists.

However, some of the local people in some regions feel the need to preserve a few species of birds and sacred forests for posterity. In the Air Mountains near Tchirzorone, a local marabout (a religious leader)) prevents destruction of trees and animals. They are also preserved for their medicinal qualities. In fact, the arrival of Abdim's stork (Ciconia abdimii) is an indication of the arrival of monsoon season giving a signal to the farmers to until their land for agricultural operations.

Its dependence on international institutions and NGOs for assistance for wild life conservation is quite large as the finances of the state are inadequate to meet the annual expenses.

Geography

As a landlocked country of the sub-Saharan region, its topography is covered with sand dunes, deserts, uplands and so forth, spread over three broad regions of: The northern desert zone; the middle zone comprising the semi-arid zone; and the southwest zone which has fertile terrain. It shares its international borders with seven countries, Nigeria, Chad, Algeria, Mali, Burkina Faso, Benin and Libya, which is a feature which makes the wildlife of the countries cross the borders freely, thus necessitating creation of national parks and reserves managed under joint cooperation programme with some of the countries.

Tertiary sediments in horizontal layers is the common geological formation is in the lowlands. Plateaux created from the sediment deposits are superimposed by laterite formations not subject to erosion. Sand deposits are a common feature in low-lying areas.

In all these hilly areas rainfall is heavy compared to the lowlands surrounding them. This condition also dictates the vegetation in the hilly areas, and even Mediterranean and Afromontane species are reported. Apart from the Niger River, the other sources of perennial surface water is the Komadougou Yobé River. In the southern region of the country where rainfall is adequate and has fertile and wooded landscape, dry land agriculture is practiced.

Drainage from this mountain ranges flows into the Niger River, the only perennial source in the country, which flows in the southwest. It is a crucial major source of water for the sustenance of the wildlife of the country. Another source of surface water is Lake Chad, which is an ephemeral lake as it gets filled only during rains, and during the dry season puddles of water are seen here (January to May). Over the years its size has also reduced.

Another source of water is ground water from a rich aquifer called the 'Iullemeden' which extends into the neighbouring countries of Mali and Nigeria and it is in a stage of over exploitation. Laws have been put in place by the three countries to prevent over extraction to avoid lowering of water table and also affecting flows into the Niger River. Oases is also a source of water in the desert region of the country.

Climate 
Niger's climate, which dictates its wildlife distribution, is subtropical in the north and tropical in the south and data of Niamey is an indicator for the entire country. Drought conditions are quite common as the monsoon rainy season is short and its distribution in the three geographical regions vary.

This condition coupled with high temperatures cause drought situation in many years affecting the vegetation.

Spatial distribution of the rainfall varies from region to region.

Milder cold temperatures are reported during the three months of December, January and February. It is for this that the vegetation in the wildlife of the country richness is very limited; the Savannah region recording Herbaceous species of plants and trees.

National Parks and reserves

Niger's protected areas comprise about 7.7 percent of the total land area. Six of the reserves are fully categorized under the IUCN.
The protected areas are the: Aïr and Ténéré National Nature Reserve including the Addax Sanctuary ), Tamou total faunal reserve , Gadabedji total Reserve, Tadres Reserve, Tamou Reserve, Dosso partial Faunal Reserve , Dallol Bosso, Kokorou Wetland, Termit Massif Faunal Reserve Buffer Zone, and W National Park.

This is apart from 79 Forest Reserves covering  and 51 restoration and land protection areas of  encompassing three geographic regions;these are administered by the Direction de l'Environnement of the MHE. A few fishing reserves to conserve its aquatic resources are also proposed to be set up. Four wetlands have been included under Ramsar Convention of Wetlands.

W National Park

This trans border park has the affix of letter "W", as it is located in a bend of the Niger River which meanders in this stretch of the park to form the figure "W". As it is a transborder park and its management is under the control of Benin, Burkina Faso, and Niger. It is home for four of the five big animal species – the elephant, lion, African buffaloes and the leopard. Within the park, the savanna habitat extends over an area of 10,000 km2.

The park is very rich in bird species, 450 species are reported, which is said to be "one of the largest varieties anywhere on earth." Commonly reported in the park are hippos, jackals and many types of monkeys, snakes and reptiles. It is a World heritage Site and also a Regional Biosphere Reserve. Home to the giraffe, Giraffa camelopardalis peralta, it is reported to be last surviving population of the West African race.

Aïr and Ténéré Reserve
The Aïr and Ténéré Reserves of  area (Aïr is a Massif and Ténéré is a desert area) have been a UNESCO World Heritage Site since 1991, and declared endangered in 1998. It encloses both the eastern half of the Aïr Mountains and the western sections of the Ténéré desert. It is the second largest nature reserve in Africa, and the fourth largest in the world.

The reserve is rich in fauna and flora. Home to a dwindling population of ostriches, the Sahara conservation efforts are put in place to increase the number of this species in the reserve. It encloses the Addax Sanctuary Strict Nature Reserve, established in 1988, as a core area, specifically to protect the Addax (Addax nasomaculatus). It is also identified by BirdLife International as an Important Bird Area.

Termit Massif reserve

The Termit Massif reserve is now, since 2012, under a new decree. It encloses an area of  area, which is the largest single reserve in Africa. It is also a Saharan antelopes conservation area since 1998 as it has a combination of desert and mountain habitats covering the Saharan and Sahelian zones in the country. The whole area of Termit Massif and Tin Toumma desert is considered a biodiversity hotspot. Its arid land fauna consists of addax, dama and dorcas gazelles, cheetah, Barbary sheep and striped hyena, bustards (Nubian and Sudan) and spurred tortoise. It is also the habitat for the Critically Endangered dama gazelle.

Wildlife
There are 136 mammal species in Niger, of which 2 are critically endangered, 2 are endangered, 9 are vulnerable, and 1 is near-threatened. One of the species listed for Niger can no longer be found in the wild. Bird Life International has reported 528 species of birds of which three are globally threatened and one is an introduced species; many species may be yet to be discovered in the rich avifauna seen here in spite of thin vegetation.

Flora
The desert ecosystems dominates the land topography of Niger. In spite of this arid climate, it has 2124 plant species of which 210 have nutritive value (particularly during famine).
Floral vegetation in the wildlife of Niger is very limited due to the climatic conditions. The floral species reported in the Savannah region consist generally of kapok, baobab, bastard mahogany, shea tree species, prickly grass (Cenchrus biflorus), acacia trees. The total forest area reported at 11.2 million ha is only 8% of the land area of the country including 0.65 of classified forests.

Fauna

Mammals

There are 3200 faunal species which includes 2021 insects. 
The topographic and climatic conditions of the country has resulted in faunal species dominated by rare species such as African bush elephant (Loxodonta africana), striped hyena, Northwest African cheetah (Acinonyx jubatus hecki), waterbuck, African leopard (Panthera pardus pardus), West African lion (Panthera leo senegalensis), antelope, common warthog (Phacochoerus africanus), scimitar oryx (Oryx dammah), hippopotamuses (Hippopotamus amphibius) in the Niger River, crocodiles, horned vipers, lizards, pythons, manatee, the endemic Nigerian giraffe (Giraffa camelopardalis peralta) which is endangered, the Critically Endangered dama gazelle, which is the national symbol of Niger (named meyna or ménas in the Hausa language) as well as Soemmerring's gazelle (Nanger soemmerringii), Grant's gazelle (Nanger granti) and slender-horned gazelle (Gazella leptoceros).

The population of the dama species, according to IUCN, declined from the stage of Vulnerable in 1986, Endangered in 1990 to Critically Endangered in 2006. Its numbers are low in the eastern Aïr and Ténéré National Nature Reserve in Niger, and in the border region of Mali and Niger; this decline is attributed to loss of habitat and mostly to indiscriminate hunting.

Four species of sympatric canids, the Egyptian wolf, Rüppell's fox, pale fox and fennec, two small cats species of Saharan sand cat and African wildcat, caracal, Striped hyena and Northeast African cheetah are also particularly reported from the Termit and Tin Toumma Reserves. To preserve the wildlife of this area, the Termit Reserve has been extended to include Tin Toumma region to cover an area of 100,000 km2, the largest single reserve in Africa.

Avifauna

The number of avifaunal species reported is 528 to 530. Threatened species of birds with the IUCN designations of Least Concern (LC), Near-threatened (NT), Vulnerable (VU) or Endangered (EN) are: North African ostrich (Struthio camelus camelus, LC); ferruginous duck (Aythya nyroca, NT); lesser flamingo (Phoenicopterus minor, NT); white-backed vulture (Gyps africanus, NT); Rueppell's griffon (Gyps rueppellii, NT); pallid harrier (Circus macrourus, NT); red kite (Milvus milvus, NT); Stanley bustard (Neotis denhami, NT); Nubian bustard (Neotis nuba, NT); corn crake (Crex crex, NT); black crowned crane (Balearica pavonina, NT); Eurasian curlew (Numenius arquata, NT); black-tailed godwit (Limosa limosa, NT); great snipe (Gallinago media, NT); African skimmer (Rynchops flavirostris, NT); European roller (Coracias garrulus, NT); red-footed falcon (Falco vespertinus, NT); sooty falcon (Falco concolor, NT); white-headed vulture (Trigonoceps occipitalis, VU); Beaudouin's snake-eagle (Circaetus beaudouini, VU); lesser kestrel (Falco naumanni, VU); and Egyptian vulture (Neophron percnopterus, EN).

Six different raptor species are well known. There are 41 migrant birds which visit Niger from Europe. Migrant birds are a common sight during the rainy season when the arid area turns into temporary wetland. The species types found are water birds and raptors. It is also noted that a few bird species such as nightingales and whinchats migrate during summer season to gardens in Europe. The country does not have any endemic or near endemic species of birds.

Reptiles
The notable reptiles are the Nile crocodile (Crocodylus niloticus) and lizard species such as Varanus griseus and Varanus niloticus. Also reported are the python species Python sebae and Python regius. Tortoise species include the African spurred tortoise (Testudo sulcata); aquatic turtle species include Trionyx triunguis and Pelomedusa subrufa.

Aquafauna

The Niger River and Lake Chad are fish habitats. Lake Chad holds 85 fish species. The notable species is Nile perch (Lates niloticus), which has a rich economic potential. In the dry season, when the lake and water holes dry up, the fishes survive buried in the sands with a mucous protection membrane. Species of amphibians also survive in dry conditions by burying themselves in moist soil layers.

Threats
Environmental issues in Niger include destructive farming practices as a result of population pressure. Illegal hunting, bush fires in some areas, human encroachment upon the flood plains of the Niger River for paddy cultivation are environmental issues. Dams constructed on the Niger River in the neighbouring countries of Mali and Guinea and also within Niger itself are also cited as a reason for a reduction of water flow in the Niger River – which has a direct effect upon the environment. A lack of adequate staff to guard wildlife in the parks and reserves is another factor cited for loss of wildlife.

References

Further reading

External links

 

Biota of Niger
Niger